Chaenactideae is a tribe of flowering plants in the subfamily Asteroideae of the family Asteraceae.

Chaenactideae genera recognized by the Global Compositae Database as of April 2022:
Chaenactis 
Dimeresia 
Orochaenactis

References

 
Asteraceae tribes